Fishel is a surname. Notable people with the surname include:

Danielle Fishel, American actress, director, and model
Elizabeth Fishel, journalist and author
Leo Fishel, baseball player
Fishel Jacobs

See also
Fischel
Fischl

Jewish surnames
Yiddish-language surnames